Florian Stalder (born 13 September 1982 in Lenk) is a Swiss former racing cyclist who last rode for .

Major Results

2003
3rd Overall GP Tell
5th Giro del Canavese
2004
4th Overall GP Tell
2005
9th Overall Rheinland-Pfalz Rundfahrt
2006
5th Paris–Bourges
2007
2nd Giro del Veneto
4th Rund um die Hainleite
8th Rund um den Henninger Turm
10th Memorial Cimurri - Gran Premio Bioera
2008
6th GP Triberg-Schwarzwald
8th Giro del Mendrisiotto
2009
9th Overall Tour of the Gila

External links

Swiss male cyclists
1982 births
Living people
Sportspeople from the canton of Bern